Neerparavai is a 2012 Indian Tamil-language drama film written and directed by Seenu Ramasamy and produced by Udhayanidhi Stalin. It stars Vishnu and Sunaina, and Nandita Das plays the older version of the latter's character. Saranya Ponvannan, Samuthirakani, Varsha Ashwathi, and Anupama Kumar play supporting roles. The music is composed by N. R. Raghunanthan with cinematography by Balasubramaniem and editing by Kasi Viswanathan. The film released on 30 November 2012 to positive reviews from critics and did well at the box-office.

Plot
The film is introduced when an old lady's (Nandita Das) son and daughter-in-law come to stay in her house, where she is solitary. The son asks his mother to sell off the house in that coastal village, so that he can build a house in the city with Aid of his father in law. but the old lady refuses to sell the house. Every often, the son and daughter-in-law notice that the lady goes to the beach, and prays in the garden every night. When they ask her why she is going to the beach, she says that she is waiting for her husband to come. The son gets angry and says because she has been waiting for 25 years, he is not going to come. Whilst the mother goes to the beach, the couple digs where she is praying and finds a skeleton. They report this to the police, and the case is handled by Inspector Agnes (Varsha Ashwathi), who begins interrogating the old lady. The old lady tells her past.

Arulappasamy (Vishnu) is a young man who is an alcoholic and wastrel and also a constant embarrassment to his hardworking adopted parents. Esther (Sunaina) is an orphan girl who is adopted by a nun named Sister Benita (Anupama Kumar), and she stays in the church. Arulappan slowly gets attracted to Esther, and his love for her changes him. He gives up drinking and wants to work so that he can marry Esther. However, the local fishermen do not allow him to go into the sea. The young man, due to his determination, buys a boat, marries his love, and life is all rosy until fate intervenes.

The married couple has a son. One day, Arulappan goes to fish, but after several days, he does not return. Esther is really worried about him. They find his body in a boat shot and bring him home. Esther says to keep him in the house, and it was all her fault because she is the one who sent him to work. The police releases the old lady but asks why she waits for her husband to come if she knows that he is dead. She says that only his body returned to shore, but his soul is still in the sea.

Cast

 Vishnu as Arulappasamy: a fisherman, Esther’s late husband.
 Sunaina as younger Esther:  Sister Benita’s adoptive daughter,Arulppasamy's wife(in younger days)
 Nandita Das as older Esther:Arulppsamy's widow
 Saranya Ponvannan as Mary
 Samuthirakani as Uduman Gani
 Varsha Ashwathi as Inspector Agnes
 Anupama Kumar as Sister Benita: Esther’s adoptive mother
 Azhagam Perumal as Church Father
 Poo Ram as Lourdhusamy
 Yogi Devaraj as Abraham
 Vadivukkarasi as Ebenezer
 Thambi Ramaiah as Joseph Bharathi
 Imman Annachi as Annachi
 Manochitra as Annachi's sister
 Pandi as Anthony
 Aruldoss as Fisherman
 Pasanga Sivakumar as Radhakrishnan
 Theepetti Ganesan
 Seenu Ramasamy as Doctor (Cameo appearance)

Production

Casting
Seenu Ramasamy has roped in noted writer Jeyamohan, who has written the dialogues for films like Naan Kadavul and Angadi Theru, to pen the dialogues for his film. The lead male role was initially supposed to be enacted by Vimal. Later, it was officially announced that Vishnu will be the protagonist of the movie as Vimal who was earlier roped in for the project was unable to allot dates. It will be produced by Udhayanidhi Stalin under the Red Giant Movies banner. Bindu Madhavi was signed up to portray the lead female character in the film in January 2012. However, the FEFSI strike of 2012 delayed the film, and Bindu had to opt out of the film owing to date clashes. She was subsequently replaced by Sunaina. Award-winning actress Nandita Das, who has previously been seen in critically acclaimed Tamil films including Azhagi and Kannathil Muthamittal, was also announced to be joining the team in April 2012. Furthermore, actress Saranya Ponvannan, who previously worked with Seenu in Thenmerku Paruvakaatru which fetched her the National Film Award for Best Actress, was signed for a supporting role. Samuthirakani and Anupama Kumar are also doing important roles in this movie.

Filming
As the film will narrate the story of a village fisherman, major portions of the movie would be shot in the waters of Manapad and Kulasekharapatnam. The film's shoot was delayed after Vishnu injured his arm while playing in the Celebrity Cricket League and the shoot will continue on 8 April. By early June, Seenu Ramasamy had completed the shoot of the talking part of the film and the crew would be shooting fight sequences and song sequences for 25 days, starting from 15 June.

Soundtrack

N. R. Raghunanthan composed the soundtrack, teaming up with Seenu Ramasamy for the second time. The soundtrack album consists of 7 tracks. The lyrics were written by Vairamuthu. The audio was launched in a grand, emotional and classy manner at the Satyam Cinemas on 10 October 2012. However, a few lines in "Meenuku Siru Meenuku" created controversy among Christians, which led them to protest against the song; thus, the lyrics few words were changed.

Reception

Behindwoods wrote:"Neerparavai is N.R.R’s best album so far that deserves a few more listens".

Critical reception
Sify gave 4 stars with a "good" Verdict and said the movie as "a moving drama that will undoubtedly leave you with a lump in your throat. And films like this are hard to find." Malathi Rangarajan from The Hindu called the movie as "soaring high" and said, "If meaningful cinema matters to you, go for it," by adding, "as a producer, Udhayanidhi Stalin can be proud of having backed a purposeful film, and as a creator, Seenu Ramasamy makes the water bird preen, and soar with confidence."  Behindwoods rated as 3/5 and said, "A simple love story narrated neatly. All the departments of Neer Paravai have worked in tandem, resulting in a satisfying experience for the viewer." Pavithra Srinivasan from Rediff gave 3 out of 5 with a "go watch" tag and said "[It] is a beautiful record of the lives of a community, their hopes and dreams, and the harsh reality of their lives." IBNLive praised the movie by saying, "This Tamil film deserves praise for conviction" Haricharan Pudipeddi from Nowrunning.com rated the movie 3/5 by saying, "Neerparavai is a fitting and beautiful saga of sea-folks, whose lives most often get sabotaged by reality."

Awards
2nd South Indian International Movie Awards
 Best Actress in a Supporting Role – Saranya
 Nominated – Best Director – Seenu Ramasamy
 Nominated – Best Cinematographer – Balasubramaniem
 Nominated – Best Actor – Vishnu
 Nominated – Best Actor in a Supporting Role – "Poo" Ram
 Nominated – Best Actress in a Supporting Role – Nandita Das
 Nominated – Best Lyricist – Vairamuthu for "Para Para"
 Nominated – Best Male Playback Singer – G. V. Prakash Kumar for "Para Para"

Vikatan Awards
 Vikatan Award For Best Male Character Artist – "Poo" Ram

60th Filmfare Awards South – 2013
Nominated – Filmfare Award for Best Film – Tamil
Nominated – Best Actress – Tamil – Sunaina
Nominated – Best Supporting Actress – Tamil – Nandita Das
Won – Best Supporting Actress – Tamil – Saranya Ponvannan

References

External links
 

2012 films
2010s Tamil-language films
Films directed by Seenu Ramasamy